Dokapon! Ikari no Tetsuken is a role playing video game made for the PlayStation. It is the third game in the Dokapon series made by Asmik Ace Entertainment made after Dokapon 3-2-1. It is popular within Thailand and up to 3 or 4 players can play. Dokapon is a game that takes players to a world of fantasy to possess the best treasure by beating the enemies and the other players in the game as well.

Gameplay
Dokapon is styled like a board game, it uses compass rotation and players move by the number shown. There are various events on spaces. Followed by 1), Before their roll, players can use their items, or magic. 2). Players rotate the compass, stop at any number and walk by that number. In each round, players can use their items or magic before moving that can inflict damage or status ailments. When a player stops on a normal space either a monster will appear or an event (indicated by an !) will trigger. Players that land on the same space will fight each other. Players then must choose two cards when the fight begins. If the card is red (先攻) the players is an attacker, if the card is blue (後攻) that player is a defender.

After that, players choose their battle skills to fight.

Plot
Dokapon is a game that leads players to the world of fantasy. The king was giving out money. However he was fake and thus, transforms into Wallace. The god was the original king, thus he tells the players to defeat all the Wallaces in the game.

References

1998 video games
Digital tabletop games
Fantasy video games
Japan-exclusive video games
Role-playing video games
PlayStation (console) games
PlayStation (console)-only games
Video games developed in Japan